The 42nd Manitoba Legislature was created following a general election in 2019.

The Progressive Conservative Party, led by Brian Pallister, formed a majority government after winning a majority of seats in the Legislative Assembly of Manitoba.

Members of the 42nd Legislative Assembly 

Members in bold are in the Cabinet of Manitoba

Notes

References 

Terms of the Manitoba Legislature
2019 establishments in Manitoba